Melekessky District  is an administrative and municipal district (raion), one of the twenty-one in Ulyanovsk Oblast, Russia. It is located in the northeast of the oblast. Its administrative center is the city of Dimitrovgrad (which is not administratively a part of the district). Population: 36,718 (2010 Census);

Administrative and municipal status
Within the framework of administrative divisions, Melekessky District is one of the twenty-one in the oblast. The city of Dimitrovgrad serves as its administrative center, despite being incorporated separately as a city of oblast significance—an administrative unit with the status equal to that of the districts.

As a municipal division, the district is incorporated as Melekessky Municipal District. The city of oblast significance of Dimitrovgrad is incorporated separately from the district as Dimitrovgrad Urban Okrug.

References

Notes

Sources

Districts of Ulyanovsk Oblast
